Aloe squarrosa is a species of flowering plant in the Asphodelaceae family. It is from the island of Socotra, Yemen.

Distribution and habitat

Aloe squarrosa is endemic to the island of Socotra, Yemen.  It is one of three Aloe species that are indigenous to this island, the other two being Aloe perryi and Aloe jawiyon.

The natural habitat of Aloe squarrosa is limestone cliff-faces and rocky areas. It is threatened by habitat destruction and is destroyed by goat herding.

Identification

Aloe squarrosa has smooth, green, spotted leaves that curve backwards. These recurved leaves are kept only around the head or top of each stem, with dead leaves falling off the lower parts of the stem. The inflorescence is short and simple, and the flowers are light orange with green tips. It is relatively rare in cultivation.

It is frequently confused with Aloe juvenna from Kenya. However the more common Aloe juvenna has shorter, straight, non-recurved triangular leaves and grows long stems, with the leaves retained all along the stems.

References

squarrosa
Endemic flora of Socotra
Vulnerable plants
Taxonomy articles created by Polbot
Taxa named by John Gilbert Baker
Taxa named by Isaac Bayley Balfour